Madison Christian School (MCS) is a private Christian school in Groveport, Ohio. It is accredited by the Association of Christian Schools International and AdvancED. It was founded in 1978 and is a non-profit organization The campus comprises approximately 64 acres near the city of Columbus.

History

1977 | A year of prayer and careful planning
1978 | Madison Christian School began with 15 preschool students
1979 | Kindergarten program added
1980 | Grades one through five added
1981 | Ohio Department of Education granted a “Letter of Approval”
1981 | Sixth grade added
1982 | A modular building was added
1983 | State Charter extended to include grades seven and eight
1983 | “Cued Speech Program” for Hearing Impaired
1983 | “Role Modeling Program” for MR Students
1989 | Two wings (10,000 square feet) were added to the main building
1994 | New modular building added three classrooms
1997 | Ground was broken in February for an Activity Center/High School
1997 | Tenth grade added: seventh through ninth housed in new facility
1998 | Tenth grade charter granted from Ohio Department of Education
1999 | Eleventh grade charter granted from Ohio Department of Education
2000 | Twelfth grade charter granted from Ohio Department of Education
2001 | First graduating class of twelve students
2005 | ACSI Boys Basketball State Champs
2005 | MCS Athletics joined OHSAA / MOCAL
2010 | ACSI Accreditation Process Began
2011 | Official candidacy for ACSI accreditation
2012 | Formation of Curriculum Departments
2014 | Official Accreditation by ACSI and AdvancED                                                                       
2016 | International program begins after obtaining SEVIS certification
2016 | Elementary chapel renovation
2017 | Gymnasium enhancements / flooring resurfaced
2018 | Introduction of the House System in the Jr./Sr. High
2018 | Major improvements in Elementary (landscaping) & Jr./Sr. High (modular unit) to commemorate the 40th anniversary
2020 | Cancellation of the House System in the Jr./Sr. High
2022 | Addition of the Middle School modular building

Athletics

Madison Christian School is a member of the Ohio High School Athletic Association (OHSAA). High school teams participate in the Mid-Ohio Christian Athletic League which includes the following private schools: Delaware Christian School, Granville Christian Academy, Madison Christian School, Northside Christian, Shekinah Christian, and Tree of Life Christian Schools. Junior High teams compete in the Central Ohio Athletic League (COAL). Additionally, MCS participates with various non-league public and private schools in and around the Central Ohio area.

Madison Christian School participates in baseball, track and field, basketball, soccer, tennis, volleyball, cross country, and softball. Junior high, JV, and varsity levels are available for both male and female students.

Arts and activities

Madison Christian School students take part in the arts through the offerings of drama, band, and choir. MCS's most recent theatrical productions include Cheaper by the Dozen and upcoming Meet me in St. Louis.

Extracurricular activities include Chess Club, fall underclassmen events, chapel services, Eagle Leadership Experience, student movie nights, Christmas service projects, a juinor/senior Gala, Student Council, class retreats, National Honor Society, student-led Bible studies, Class Unity Day, "All-In Night", National Junior Honor Society, and Serve-a-thon.

References

External links
 Official Madison Christian School site
 Association of Christian Schools International (ACSI) site

Christian schools in Ohio
Private high schools in Ohio
Nondenominational Christian schools in the United States
Educational institutions established in 1978
Private middle schools in Ohio
Private elementary schools in Ohio
1970 establishments in Ohio